The sixth season of Malcolm in the Middle premiered on November 7, 2004, on Fox, and ended on May 15, 2005, with a total of 22 episodes. Frankie Muniz stars as the title character Malcolm, and he is joined by Jane Kaczmarek, Bryan Cranston, Christopher Kennedy Masterson, Justin Berfield and Erik Per Sullivan.

Episodes

Cast and characters

Main 
 Frankie Muniz as Malcolm
 Jane Kaczmarek as Lois
 Bryan Cranston as Hal
 Christopher Kennedy Masterson as Francis
 Justin Berfield as Reese
 Erik Per Sullivan as Dewey

Recurring 
 Craig Lamar Traylor as Stevie Kenarban
 Amy Bruckner as Zoe
 Cameron Monaghan as Chad
 Danny McCarthy as Hanson
 David Anthony Higgins as Craig Feldspar
 Emy Coligado as Piama
 Cloris Leachman as Ida

Production 
In April 2004, Fox renewed Malcolm in the Middle for a sixth season. Main cast members Frankie Muniz, Jane Kaczmarek, Bryan Cranston, Christopher Kennedy Masterson, Justin Berfield and Erik Per Sullivan return as Malcolm, Lois, Hal, Francis, Reese and Dewey respectively. Masterson made fewer appearances in the season, and it was written into the storyline that he has been fired from the ranch he joined in season four.

Release

Broadcast history 
The season premiered on November 7, 2004 on Fox, and ended on May 15, 2005 with a total of 22 episodes.

Home media 
The season was released on Region 2 DVD on May 27, 2013, and on Region 4 DVD on September 4, 2013.

Reception 
John Leonard of New York wrote, "[T]hose of you who have followed Malcolm to a military academy, a dude ranch, and Afghanistan, through jury duty, hangovers, shoplifting, book clubs, hot tubs, and Oliver North, ought to know better than to doubt for a second the savage savvy of Lois in her solitary splendor. All in one, she is Mother Jones, Mother Courage, Mother Goose, Mother Superior—and Pol Pot." At the 57th Primetime Emmy Awards, the song "The Marriage Bed" that was written by Eric Kaplan and composed by Charles Sydnor for the episode "Dewey's Opera" was nominated for the Primetime Emmy Award for Outstanding Music and Lyrics. In the same ceremony, Kaczmarek was nominated for Outstanding Lead Actress in a Comedy Series, and Cloris Leachman for Outstanding Guest Actress In A Comedy Series.

In 2019, Angelo Delos Trinos of Screen Rant included the episode "Pearl Harbor" in his list, "10 Episodes Of Malcolm in the Middle That Aged Poorly". He wrote, "It’s not the show’s worst foray into risqué territory, but Pearl Harbor really belongs in 2004 when it first aired." In 2020, Ricky Fernandes da Conceição of Goomba Stomp named "Reese Comes Home", "Pearl Harbor", "Dewey’s Opera" and "Billboard" as among the "30 Best Episodes of Malcolm in the Middle".

References 

2004 American television seasons
2005 American television seasons
Malcolm in the Middle